Niobium oxide, sometimes called columbium oxide, may refer to:

 Niobium monoxide (niobium(II) oxide), NbO
 Niobium dioxide (niobium(IV) oxide), NbO2
 Niobium pentoxide (niobium(V) oxide), Nb2O5

In addition to the above, other distinct oxides exist
general formula Nb3n+1O8n−2 where n ranges from 5 - 8 inclusive, e.g. Nb8O19 (Nb16O38).
 Nb12O29 and Nb47O116

Natural niobium oxide is sometimes known as niobia.

References